The Gates of Hell is a monumental bronze sculptural group work by French artist Auguste Rodin that depicts a scene from the Inferno, the first section of Dante Alighieri's Divine Comedy. It stands at 6 metres high, 4 metres wide and 1 metre deep and contains 180 figures. Several of the figures were also cast as independent free-standing statues.

History
The sculpture was commissioned by the Directorate of Fine Arts in 1880 and was meant to be delivered in 1885.

Rodin would continue to work on and off on this project for 37 years, until his death in 1917.

The Directorate asked for an inviting entrance to a planned Decorative Arts Museum with the theme being left to Rodin's selection. Even before this commission, Rodin had developed sketches of some of Dante's characters based on his admiration of Dante's Inferno.

The Decorative Arts Museum was never built. Rodin worked on this project on the ground floor of the Hôtel Biron. Near the end of his life, Rodin donated sculptures, drawings and reproduction rights to the French government. In 1919, two years after his death, the Hôtel Biron became the Musée Rodin, housing a cast of The Gates of Hell and related works.

Inspiration

Rodin conceived that people would walk toward the work, perhaps up a flight of stairs, and be overwhelmed frontally by the massive gates, contemplating the experience of hell that Dante describes in his Inferno. Rodin thought particularly of Dante's warning over the entrance of the Inferno, "Abandon every hope, who enter here."

A work of the scope of The Gates of Hell had not been attempted before, but inspiration came from Lorenzo Ghiberti's Gates of Paradise at the Baptistery of St. John, Florence, 15th century bronze doors depicting figures from the Old Testament. Another source of inspiration was medieval cathedrals combining high and low relief. Rodin was also inspired by Michelangelo's fresco The Last Judgment, Delacroix's painting The Barque of Dante, Balzac's collection La Comédie humaine and Baudelaire's poems Les Fleurs du mal.

In an article in Le Matin, Rodin said: "For a whole year I lived with Dante, with him alone, drawing the eight circles of his inferno. [...] At the end of this year, I realized that while my drawing rendered my vision of Dante, they had become too remote from reality. So I started all over again, working from nature, with my models."

Gallery

Outstanding figures

The original sculptures were enlarged and became works of art of their own.

 The Thinker (Le Penseur), also called The Poet, is located above the door panels. One interpretation suggests that it might represent Dante looking down to the characters in the Inferno. Another interpretation is that the Thinker is Rodin himself meditating about his composition. Others believe that the figure may be Adam, contemplating the destruction brought upon mankind because of his sin.
 The Kiss (Le Baiser) was originally in The Gate along with other figures of Paolo and Francesca da Rimini. Rodin wanted to represent their initial joy as well as their final damnation. He removed the figure that became known as The Kiss because it seemed to conflict with the other suffering figures.
 Ugolino and His Children (Ugolin et ses enfants) depicts Ugolino della Gherardesca, who according to the story, ate the corpses of his children after they died by starvation (Dante, Inferno, Canto XXXIII). The Ugolino group was cast as a separate bronze in 1882.
 The Three Shades (Les Trois Ombres) was originally 98 cm high. The over-life size group was initially made of three independent figures in 1899. Later on, Rodin replaced one hand in the figures to fuse them together, in the same form as the smaller version.  The figures originally pointed to the phrase "Lasciate ogne speranza, voi ch'intrate" ("Abandon all hope, ye who enter here") from Canto III of the Inferno.
 Fleeting Love (Fugit Amor) is located on the right door pane, it is one of several figures of lovers that represent Paolo and Francesca da Rimini. The male figure is also called The Prodigal.
 Paolo and Francesca is shown on the left door pane. Paolo tries to reach Francesca, who seems to slip away.
 Meditation appears on the rightmost part of the tympanum, shown as an enlarged figure in 1896.
 The Old Courtesan is a bronze cast from 1910 of an aged, naked female body. The sculpture is also called She Who Was Once the Helmet-Maker's Beautiful Wife (Celle qui fut la belle heaulmière). This title is taken from a poem by François Villon.
 Fallen Caryatid Carrying Her Stone is based on the figure at the top of the left pilaster. Around 1881 Rodin enlarged her and gave her a stone.
 I Am Beautiful (Je suis belle), cast in 1882, is among the second set of figures on the extreme right portion of the door.
 Eternal Springtime (L'Éternel printemps) was cast in 1884.  It exists in several separate versions, both in marble and in bronze.
 Despair is found in various versions on both the left and right door panes. 
 Kneeling Female Faun was conceived around 1884 and first cast in 1887. It is found on the left side of the tympanum, in front of the bas-reliefs which form the background.
 Adam and Eve. Rodin asked the directorate for additional funds for the independent sculptures of Adam and Eve that were meant to frame The Gates of Hell. However, Rodin found he could not get Eve's figure right. Consequently, several figures of Eve were made, none of which were used, and all of them were later sold.

Most of the individual figures portrayed on the gates do not originate in Dante. Rodin's sculptures are not illustrations of scenes from Inferno. Rather, Rodin “reinvented” Dante's hell to include figures who personified his own conception. Dante's Adam and Eve, for example, are in Paradise, thought to have been “rescued” from eternal damnation by Christ on Holy Saturday in the Harrowing of Hell.

The three shades are a transformation of three sinners whom Dante encounters in the Seventh Circle of murderers, suicides and homosexuals, all included among the violent against others, self and nature.

Other figures are either fully invented by Rodin or derive from other literary sources.

Locations 

The original plaster was restored in 1917 and is displayed at the Musée d'Orsay in Paris. A series of plaster casts illustrating the development of the work is on view at the Musée Rodin in Meudon.  Also in 1917, a model was used to make the original three bronze casts: 
 The Musée Rodin, Paris.
 The Rodin Museum, Philadelphia, Pennsylvania.
 The National Museum of Western Art in Ueno Park, Tokyo.

Subsequent bronzes have been distributed by the Musée Rodin to a number of locations, including:
 The Kunsthaus Zürich, Zurich
 The Iris & B. Gerald Cantor Center for Visual Arts at Stanford University
 The Plateau, Seoul, Korea
 Museo Soumaya, Mexico City

See also
List of sculptures by Auguste Rodin
Dante and his Divine Comedy in popular culture

References

Further reading

External links 

La Porte de l'Enfer, a tool for exploring The Gates of Hell by the Musée Rodin
Rodin: The B. Gerald Cantor Collection, a full text exhibition catalog from The Metropolitan Museum of Art, which contains material on The Gates of Hell
  Octave Mirbeau, « Auguste Rodin ».
 The Gates of Hell, Iris & B. Gerald Cantor Center for Visual Arts at Stanford University, Object Number 1985.86, bronze cast No. 5.

Sculptures by Auguste Rodin
Sculptures of the Musée Rodin
Gates
Sculptures of the Musée d'Orsay
1917 sculptures
Bronze sculptures in Paris
Bronze sculptures in Japan
Bronze sculptures in the United Kingdom
Bronze sculptures in the United States
Bronze doors
Cultural depictions of Adam and Eve
Works based on Inferno (Dante)